Alfred Rabenja (27 November 1944 – March 2011) was a Malagasy sprinter. He competed in the men's 4 × 100 metres relay at the 1972 Summer Olympics.

References

1944 births
2011 deaths
Athletes (track and field) at the 1972 Summer Olympics
Malagasy male sprinters
Olympic athletes of Madagascar
Place of birth missing